Nilo Humberto Acuña Bordaborria (26 September 1943 – 29 August 2004) was a professional footballer who played in the Uruguayan Primera División and Mexican Primera División.

Career
Born in Montevideo, Acuña played as a forward. He began playing for Liverpool de Montevideo, before joining Peñarol in 1967. He won consecutive Uruguayan league titles in 1967 and 1968, and helped the club reach the 1970 Copa Libertadores final in his first stint with the club.

In 1972, Acuña moved to Mexico to join Monterrey for three seasons. He returned to Uruguay to finish his career with Peñarol.

After he retired from playing, Acuña became a football coach. He was a member of Jorge Fossati's staff which led LDU Quito to the 2003 Ecuadorian league title. In 2004, he joined Fossati's coaching staff on the Uruguay national football team.

Personal
Acuña developed a tumor and died at age 60 in August 2004.

References

1943 births
2004 deaths
Footballers from Montevideo
Association football forwards
Uruguayan footballers
Uruguay international footballers
Liverpool F.C. (Montevideo) players
Peñarol players
C.F. Monterrey players
Uruguayan Primera División players
Liga MX players
Uruguayan expatriate footballers
Expatriate footballers in Mexico